Aislaby is a hamlet and civil parish near the English town of Pickering, North Yorkshire.  It lies on the A170 to the west of Pickering between Wrelton and Middleton.

History
The hamlet is mentioned in the Domesday Book and was known as Aslachesbi. In 1066 the land was owned by Gospatric and had 2 ploughlands.

The etymology of the name comes from Old Norse bȳ (farm or village) added to the name of the ownerAslakr.

Demographics
The population of the civil parish was less than 100 at the 2011 Census. Details are included in the civil parish of Cropton.

Governance
The hamlet is within the Thirsk and Malton Parliamentary constituency; the Pickering Electoral Ward of North Yorkshire County Council; and the Cropton Ward of Ryedale District Council. The hamlet is part of the civil parish of Aislaby, Middleton and Wrelton.

Community
The hamlet lies within the Primary Education catchment area for Pickering Junior School and the Secondary Education catchment area for Lady Lumley's School in Pickering.

References

External links 
 

Villages in North Yorkshire
Civil parishes in North Yorkshire